Kevin M. McCarthy (born 1940) is a professor and author in Florida. He was born in Gainesville, Florida and returned to live and work there as a professor at the University of Florida. He received the Charlton Tebeau Award (Charlton Tebeau) from the Florida Historical Society in 1994 for African Americans in Florida: An Illustrated History and the Patrick Smith Literary Prize (Patrick Smith) from Library of the Florida Historical Society in  1999 for A River in Flood and Other Florida Stories by Marjory Stoneman Douglas.

He has written books about various aspects of Florida's history including the history of African Americans in Florida, He has also written about baseball and football in Florida.

Books
Florida Stories (1989)
 
 The Book Lover’s Guide to Florida (1992)
Thirty Florida Shipwrecks (1992)
 African Americans in Florida (1993)
 The Gators and the Seminoles (1993)
Twenty Florida Pirates (1994)
Baseball in Florida (1996)
Guide to the University of Florida and Gainesville (1997)
Native Americans in Florida (1999)
Christmas in Florida (2000)
Aviation in Florida (2003)
African American Sites in Florida (2007)
Cedar Key, Florida (2007)
The Autobiography of Kevin M. McCarthy (2015)
Black Florida
Caloosahatchee River Guidebook
Suwanee River Guidebook
St. Johns River Guidebook
Castles of Turkey
Fightin' Gators: A History of the University of Florida Football and aviation.

References

21st-century American historians
20th-century American historians
Historians from Florida
1940 births
Living people